Kauchuk Factory Club is a 1927-1929 russian avant-garde public building designed by Konstantin Melnikov, located in Khamovniki District of Moscow, Russia on the edge of Devichye Pole park and medical campus at 64, Plyshikha Street.

History and architecture

Kauchuk rubber factory, originally based in Riga, relocated to Khamovniki in Moscow in 1915, threatened by German offensive, and was considerably expanded afterwards. Construction of a club was part of a 1920s nationwide drive to replace religion with more appropriate entertainment. Melnikov theorized that "Club is not a stern temple of some deity. We must attain such an atmosphere, that we would not need to drag a worker in. He would run there himself, past his home and past his pub... the club, if it succeeds, will show what the new private life is all about".

Preservation

The club, like all 1920s buildings, is under threat of demolition.  As of March, 2007, preservationists succeeded to delay demolition. The building operates a night club and a restaurant, and is in adequate external condition; huge neon lettering that existed in 2003, has been removed. However, its interiors are lost to indiscriminate renovation, original windows are replaced with improperly-sized modern frames. According to Russian press, the building is operated by "Academy of Russian Art", established by pianist Nikolai Petrov.

References
 Khan-Magomedov, "Pioneers of Soviet Architecture: The Search for New Solutions in the 1920s and 1930s", Thames and Hudson Ltd, 
 Russian bio: Russian: Хан-Магомедов, С.О., "Константин Мельников", М, 2006  (Khan-Magomedov, 2006)

References

Theatres in Moscow
Constructivist architecture
Buildings and structures built in the Soviet Union
Buildings and structures in Moscow
20th century in Moscow
Modernist architecture in Russia
Cultural heritage monuments of regional significance in Moscow